Mikhaylovka is a rural locality (a village) in Karlamansky Selsoviet, Karmaskalinsky District, Bashkortostan, Russia. The population was 2 as of 2010. There is 1 street.

Geography 
Mikhaylovka is located 13 km northeast of Karmaskaly (the district's administrative centre) by road. Oktyabr is the nearest rural locality.

References 

Rural localities in Karmaskalinsky District